"Sweet Thing" or "Sweet Thing/Candidate/Sweet Thing (Reprise)" is a suite of songs written by David Bowie for the album Diamond Dogs. Recorded in January 1974, the piece comprises the songs "Sweet Thing" and "Candidate" and a one-verse reprise of "Sweet Thing."

In the opening line, "Sweet Thing" contains the lowest note Bowie had recorded in a studio album (C2) until "I Took a Trip on a Gemini Spacecraft" for the album Heathen (2002), where he growled the word "Well" (G1) towards the end of the song.

Bowie recorded a track with the same title, "Candidate" – but no musical similarity to the Diamond Dogs song "Candidate" and only a few words of lyrics in common – during the first several days of January 1974.  It was unavailable until 1990 when it was released as a bonus track on the Rykodisc reissue of Diamond Dogs; it also appeared on the bonus disc of the 30th Anniversary Edition of Diamond Dogs in 2004.

"Tragic Moments/Zion/Aladdin Vein"
A track now referred to as "Zion" has also appeared on bootlegs under the titles "Aladdin Vein", "Love Aladdin Vein", "A Lad in Vein", and "A Lad in Vain". Incorporating parts reminiscent of "Aladdin Sane" and what would become "Sweet Thing (Reprise)" on Diamond Dogs, this instrumental piece was generally thought to have been recorded during the Aladdin Sane sessions at Trident Studios early in 1973. However a recent estimate places it alongside recordings for Pin Ups later that year, as a preview of Bowie's next original work, leading author Nicholas Pegg to suggest that it "perhaps ought to be regarded more as a Diamond Dogs demo than an Aladdin Sane out-take". A 1973 article about Bowie recording Pinups in France accurately describes the song, which seems to confirm Pegg's theory:

Personnel
David Bowie: Vocals, Guitar, Sax, Mellotron, Moog synthesizer
Mike Garson: Piano
Herbie Flowers: Bass Guitar
Tony Newman: Drums
Tony Visconti: Strings

Live versions
A live version of "Sweet Thing/Candidate/Sweet Thing (Reprise)" from the first leg of the Diamond Dogs Tour was released on David Live. A live recording from the second leg of the same tour (previously available on the unofficial album A Portrait in Flesh) was released in 2017 on Cracked Actor (Live Los Angeles '74).

In one live version in the first line, Bowie sings a step higher than C2, and a little more clearly.  Some skeptics have accused Bowie of "studio tinkering" to enhance his range, but this is proof that he was capable of singing a C2.

Cover versions
 Morel – on the album  The Death of the Paperboy (2008), on Disc-0 of the two-disc set.  This is a cover of the complete trilogy of "Sweet Thing"/"Candidate"/"Sweet Thing (Reprise)", as it appears on Diamond Dogs and David Live.
 Joan as Police Woman – on the album Real Life (2006), on additional tracks of the 2-CD edition.  This cover includes "Sweet Thing" and the reprise.
 Awaken – on the album Party in Lyceum's Toilets (2001).  This is a cover of only the "Sweet Thing" song proper.
 Paper Jones – on the album Life Beyond Mars: Bowie Covered (2008).  This is a cover of only the "Sweet Thing" song proper.
 Momus – on the album Turpsycore (2015). This is a cover of only the "Sweet Thing" song proper.

Notes

David Bowie songs
1974 songs
Songs written by David Bowie
Song recordings produced by David Bowie